Myrtle Olive Felix Robertson, 11th Baroness Wharton (née Arbuthnot; 20 February 1934 – 15 May 2000), known as Ziki Robertson and professionally as Ziki Arnot, was a photographer, model and actress. She was the daughter of David George Arbuthnot and Elisabeth, née Kemeys-Tynte, 10th Baroness Wharton. She was brought up in South Africa but moved to England in her teens.

When her mother died in 1974, the Barony went into abeyance. This was terminated in 1990, and Ziki Robertson became 11th Baroness Wharton. She was one of the 92 hereditary peers who were elected under the House of Lords Act 1999 to continue as members of the Lords when most of the hereditary peers lost their seats. She was Vice President of the RSPCA.

She married Henry MacLeod Robertson and had four children including Myles Christopher David Robertson, 12th Baron Wharton. She died of Creutzfeldt–Jakob disease.

References

 Burke's Peerage & Baronetage 107th edition.
 
Amazon, "Parliament in Pictures", Turner & Hudson

1934 births
2000 deaths
English photographers
Hereditary women peers
Deaths from Creutzfeldt–Jakob disease
Neurological disease deaths in England
20th-century British women politicians
South African emigrants to the United Kingdom
South African people of English descent
Barons Wharton
20th-century English nobility

Hereditary peers elected under the House of Lords Act 1999